The Tell el-Ajjul gold hoards are a collection of three hoards of Bronze Age gold jewellery found at the Canaanite site of Tell el-Ajjul in Gaza. Excavated by the British archaeologist Flinders Petrie in the 1930s, the collection is now mostly preserved at the British Museum in London and the Rockefeller Museum in Jerusalem. The treasure ranks amongst the greatest Bronze Age finds in the Levant.

Discovery
During the 1930s, the renowned Egyptologist Sir William Matthews Flinders Petrie led a British archaeological expedition to Tell el-Ajjul, in the expectation that they would discover the remains of an outpost of the Egyptian New Kingdom Empire. In 1933, various pieces of gold jewellery were found on the Tell. In all, five large deposits were unearthed in several buildings on the mound, including the so-called palace. No other site in Israel or Palestine has yielded so many items made in precious metal. The British Museum's share of the treasure was purchased in 1949 from Hilda Petrie, the widow of Flinders Petrie.

Description

The jewellery from Ajjul was made almost entirely from gold (both sheet and solid), by casting, hammering or pressing. It must have belonged to a wealthy elite who benefited from the settlement's location on the trade routes between Egypt and the Middle East. Twenty six different types of jewellery have been classified, the principal groups being earrings, circlets, bracelets, beads, Egyptian scarabs and toggle pins. Most are plain ornaments cast from solid gold, although some are decorated with minute gold beads by the granulation process. A few items are in the form of animals such as falconss and flies but the most impressive objects in the hoard are the Egyptian-style pendants of the deity Astarte and gold diadems with quatrefoil florets.

References

Bibliography
 A. Kempinski, 'The Middle Bronze Age' in The archaeology of ancient Israel (New Haven, Yale University Press, 1992)
 J. N. Tubb, Canaanites (London, The British Museum Press, 1998)

1933 archaeological discoveries
Archaeological discoveries in the State of Palestine
Middle Eastern objects in the British Museum
Sculpture of the Ancient Near East
History of Palestine (region)
Archaeology of the Near East
Treasure troves of Asia
Collections of the Israel Museum
Gold objects
Astarte
Ancient art in metal